Harold Walton (1874 – 9 December 1960) was a New Zealand cricketer. He played one first-class match for Auckland in 1897/98.

See also
 List of Auckland representative cricketers

References

External links
 

1874 births
1960 deaths
New Zealand cricketers
Auckland cricketers
Place of birth missing